Esteban Andrés Suárez (born 27 June 1975), known simply as Esteban, is a Spanish retired footballer who played as a goalkeeper.

He started and finished his extensive senior career, which spanned more than two decades, at Real Oviedo. He appeared in 280 matches in La Liga over 13 seasons, also representing in the competition Atlético Madrid, Sevilla, Celta and Almería.

Club career

Early years
Born in Avilés, Asturias, Esteban began his career with hometown's SD Navarro CF in 1993, but soon moved to local giants Real Oviedo after a stint at Real Avilés Industrial. During five seasons with the first team – four of those spent in La Liga – he only missed a total of 12 league games, and moved to Atlético Madrid in the summer of 2002 as the Colchoneros had just returned to the top flight after a two-year absence, finishing the campaign as starter after beginning as understudy to Germán Burgos.

Esteban joined fellow league club Sevilla FC in August 2003. After two solid seasons with the Andalusians (two sixth league places, as first-choice) he signed for RC Celta de Vigo, backing up José Manuel Pinto in the second division side until the latter moved to FC Barcelona in January 2008.

Almería
In the 2008 off-season, Esteban joined UD Almería in the top tier, where he initially was second choice to Diego Alves in his first year. However, profiting from injury to the starter in late March 2009, he was put between the posts and remained there until the end of the season even when the Brazilian recovered.

In the 2009–10 campaign, Esteban's league output consisted of 30 minutes – the last round notwithstanding– after Alves was sent off in a 0–3 home defeat against Valencia CF. At the season's end, however, the 35-year-old renewed his contract for another year.

Esteban continued as Alves' backup in 2010–11. He was the starter, however, in Almería's Copa del Rey run, which saw the club reach the competition's semi-finals for the first time ever. In the final stretch of the campaign, as they were already relegated and Alves announced his departure to Valencia, he appeared in four matches and conceded 11 goals, including eight in a 8–1 loss at Real Madrid.

Subsequently, at 36, Esteban became Almería's first choice. He played all 42 league games during the second division season, conceding 43 goals as the team finished seventh.

Esteban did not miss one single match in the 2013–14 campaign, as the Rojiblancos were again in the Spanish top division and managed to stay afloat.

Return to Oviedo
On 13 May 2014, Esteban announced he was returning to Oviedo twelve years after leaving. An undisputed starter in his first two seasons, he was overtaken by new signing Juan Carlos in 2016–17.

On 29 June 2017, despite Esteban's willingness to play a further season, he retired and was immediately included in the club's backroom staff.

Honours

Club
Oviedo
Segunda División B: 2014–15

International
Spain U21
UEFA European Under-21 Championship: 1998

References

External links

1975 births
Living people
People from Avilés
Spanish footballers
Footballers from Asturias
Association football goalkeepers
La Liga players
Segunda División players
Segunda División B players
Tercera División players
Real Avilés CF footballers
Real Oviedo Vetusta players
Real Oviedo players
Atlético Madrid footballers
Sevilla FC players
RC Celta de Vigo players
UD Almería players
Spain under-21 international footballers